Lake Charles is a reservoir in Vernon Hills, Illinois, United States. It is serviced by Lake Charles Park, managed by the Vernon Hills Park District. Fishing is allowed on the 39.1 acre lake, and a fishing pier allows anglers to cast further into the lake. For those interested in boating, a small canoe launch is available as well. The deepest point in the lake is 10 feet (3 m), and contains bluegill, largemouth bass, and sunfish.

References

 

Lake Charles is located in the center of Gregg's Landing

Charles
Protected areas of Lake County, Illinois
Lakes of Lake County, Illinois